Rani Padmavati may refer to:

 Padmavati (wife of Ashoka), chief concubine of Emperor Ashoka
 Rani Padmini, also known as Padmavati, a legendary queen of Chittor, celebrated in the Padmavat